Linhas Aéreas Wright Ltda was a Brazilian airline formed in 1947. In 1948 it was sold to Real Transportes Aéreos.

History
Linhas Aéreas Wright was formed on April 1, 1947 by Francisco Ribeiro Wright and his brother and business partner. It had a fleet of two Lockheed Model 18 Lodestar aircraft operating between Rio de Janeiro and Santos. In March 1948 it was sold to Real Transportes Aéreos.

Destinations
Wright operated between Rio de Janeiro and Santos.

Fleet

See also
List of defunct airlines of Brazil

References

Defunct airlines of Brazil
Airlines established in 1947
Airlines disestablished in 1948
1948 disestablishments in Brazil
Brazilian companies established in 1947